In mathematics and, specifically, real analysis, the Dini derivatives (or Dini derivates) are a class of generalizations of the derivative. They were introduced by Ulisse Dini, who studied continuous but nondifferentiable functions.

The upper Dini derivative, which is also called an upper right-hand derivative, of a continuous function

where  is the supremum limit and the limit is a one-sided limit. The lower Dini derivative, is defined by

where  is the infimum limit.

If  is locally Lipschitz, then  is finite.

Remarks
 The functions are defined in terms of the infimum and supremum in order to make the Dini derivatives as "bullet proof" as possible, so that the Dini derivatives are well-defined for almost all functions, even for functions that are not conventionally differentiable. The upshot of Dini's analysis is that a function is differentiable at the point  on the real line, only if all the Dini derivatives exist, and have the same value.

 Also,

and

.

 So when using the  notation of the Dini derivatives, the plus or minus sign indicates the left- or right-hand limit, and the placement of the sign indicates the infimum or supremum limit.

 There are two further Dini derivatives, defined to be

and

.

which are the same as the first pair, but with the supremum and the infimum reversed. For only moderately ill-behaved functions, the two extra Dini derivatives aren't needed. For particularly badly behaved functions, if all four Dini derivatives have the same value then the function  is differentiable in the usual sense at the point  .

See also

References

 .
 
 

Generalizations of the derivative
Real analysis